Cyclovariegatin is a pigment. Its chemical name is 1,4-dihydro-2,7,8-trihydroxy-3-(3,4-dihydroxyphenyl)-l,4-dioxodibenzofuran. It is distinguishable by its UV-Vis spectra with maxima at 257, 296, and 430 nm. The variants cyclovariegatin-pentaacetate, cyclovariegatin-2,3',8-triacetate, and cyclovariegatin-2-acetate have also been described. It is derived from atromentin. It has been isolated from the browned skin of Suillus  grevillei var. badius, and becomes the pigment thelephoric acid.

See also
 Pulvinic acid
 Pulvinone
 Vulpinic acid

References

Biological pigments
Polyphenols
Catechols
Oxygen heterocycles
Heterocyclic compounds with 3 rings
Hydroxybenzoquinones